Martha's Vineyard Hospital is a not-for-profit regional medical center located in Oak Bluffs, Massachusetts. Founded in 1921, it is the only hospital in Dukes County.

References

External links

Hospital buildings completed in 1921
Buildings and structures in Oak Bluffs, Massachusetts
Hospitals in Dukes County, Massachusetts
1921 establishments in Massachusetts